Langford Part One is the seven-song CD EP released by the Payolas in 2007.

The album cover features a picture of the Belmont Secondary School which is the Langford high school that Bob Rock and Paul Hyde attended together.

The band announced plans for a full-length album in 2008 that would combine the songs on this EP with several newer songs.  However, the proposed full-length album project never materialized—although one newly recorded track from it ("Shark Attack") was released as a download from the Payolas' website in 2008.  It is unknown as to whether any other tracks were recorded for the full length-album project before the Payolas ceased operations in 2008, and shut down their site in 2009.

Track listing 
All songs written by Paul Hyde and Bob Rock except as indicated

 "Bomb" – 3:10
 "Revolution" – 3:25
 "Phone Hell" – 5:58
 "We are Failing" (Paul Hyde, Bob Rock, David Nelson) – 3:47
 "At the Angel's Feet" – 4:18
 "Goodbye to Rock N Roll" – 3:00
 "Revolution Jam-up" – 2:52

Personnel 
 Payolas are Paul Hyde (vocals) and Bob Rock (guitars)
 Musicians on "Phone Hell" – Drums: Jeremy Taggart, Bass: Chris Weiss, Keyboards: Jamie Edwards
 Musicians on "At the Angel's Feet" – Drums: Sean Nelson, Bass: Chris Weiss, Keyboards: Jamie Edwards, Background vocals: Mandy Lucy and Sally Rock
 All other instruments: Bob Rock

External links
 

2007 albums
Payolas albums
Albums produced by Bob Rock